Latisipho is a genus of sea snails, marine gastropod mollusks, unassigned in a subfamily of the family Buccinidae, the true whelks.

Species
Species within the genus Latisipho include:
 Latisipho aphelus (Dall, 1889)
 Latisipho errones (Dall, 1919)
 Latisipho georgianus (Dall, 1921)
 Latisipho halibrectus (Dall, 1891)
 Latisipho hallii (Dall, 1873)
 Latisipho hypolispus (Dall, 1891)
 Latisipho jordani (Dall, 1913)
 Latisipho morditus (Dall, 1919)
 Latisipho pharcidus (Dall, 1919)
 Latisipho ritteri R. N. Clark, 2022
 Latisipho severinus (Dall, 1919)
 Latisipho siphonoidea (Dall, 1913)
 Latisipho tahwitanus (Dall, 1918)
 Latisipho timetus (Dall, 1919)
Species brought into synonymy
 Latisipho acosmius (Dall, 1891): synonym of Anomalisipho acosmius (Dall, 1891)
 Latisipho bristolensis (Dall, 1919): synonym of Colus barbarinus Dall, 1919
 Latisipho halidonus (Dall, 1919): synonym of Colus halidonus (Dall, 1919)
 Latisipho hypolispus (Dall, 1891): synonym of Neptunea intersculpta (G. B. Sowerby III, 1899)

References

External links
  Kosyan, A. R. "Anatomy and taxonomic composition of the genus Latisipho Dall (Gastropoda: Buccinidae) from the Russian waters." Ruthenica 16.1-2 (2006): 17-42.
  Clark, Roger N. "Four New Deep-Sea Whelks From the North American Pacific Coast (Neogastropoda: Buccinidae)."

Buccinidae